Salted fish, such as kippered herring or dried and salted cod, is fish cured with dry salt and thus preserved for later eating. Drying or salting, either with dry salt or with brine, was the only widely available method of preserving fish until the 19th century. Dried fish and salted fish (or fish both dried and salted) are a staple of diets in the Caribbean, West Africa, North Africa, South Asia, Southeast Asia, Southern China, Scandinavia, parts of Canada including Newfoundland, coastal Russia, and in the Arctic. Like other salt-cured meats, it provides preserved animal protein even in the absence of refrigeration.

Method

Salting is the preservation of food with dry edible salt. It is related to pickling (preparing food with brine, i.e. salty water), and is one of the oldest methods of preserving food. Salt inhibits the growth of microorganisms by drawing water out of microbial cells through osmosis. Concentrations of salt up to 20% are required to kill most species of unwanted bacteria. Smoking, often used in the process of curing meat, adds chemicals to the surface of meat that reduce the concentration of salt required. Salting is used because most bacteria, fungi and other potentially pathogenic organisms cannot survive in a highly salty environment, due to the hypertonic nature of salt.  Any living cell in such an environment will become dehydrated through osmosis and die or become temporarily inactivated.

The water activity, aw, in a fish is defined as the ratio of the water vapour pressure in the flesh of the fish to the vapour pressure of pure water at the same temperature and pressure. It ranges between 0 and 1, and is a parameter that measures how available the water is in the flesh of the fish. Available water is necessary for the microbial and enzymatic reactions involved in spoilage. There are a number of techniques that have been or are used to tie up the available water or remove it by reducing the aw. Traditionally, techniques such as drying, salting and smoking have been used, and have been used for thousands of years. In more recent times, freeze-drying, water binding humectants, and fully automated equipment with temperature and humidity control have been added. Often a combination of these techniques is used.

Health effects

The American Institute for Cancer Research (AICR) and World Cancer Research Fund International (WCRF) have stated that there is strong evidence obtained mostly from Asia that consuming salted fish increases risk of stomach cancer and consuming Cantonese-style salted fish increases risk of nasopharyngeal cancer. The International Agency for Research on Cancer classify salted fish (Chinese-style) as a Group 1 carcinogen.

Gallery

See also
Cantonese salted fish
Cured fish
Salted squid
Brining
Gibbing
Pickling salt 
Spekesild (Cured, salted Atlantic herring)
Surströmming (Lightly-salted soured Baltic herring)

Notes

References
 Schwartz, RK (2004) "All roads lead to Rome: Roman food production in North Africa" Repast, 20 (4) : 5–6 and 8–9.

Food preservation
Salted foods